Clearfield is an unincorporated community in Rowan County, Kentucky, United States. Clearfield has a post office with ZIP code 40313.

References

Unincorporated communities in Rowan County, Kentucky
Unincorporated communities in Kentucky